Lima Township is one of 22 townships in Adams County, Illinois, United States. At the 2020 census, its population was 514, and it contained 241 housing units.

Geography

Cities
 Lima

Unincorporated towns
 Meyer

Cemeteries
The township contains four cemeteries: Gallimore, Higgins, Karnes and Lima.

Major highways
  Illinois State Route 96

Airports and landing strips
 Hagemeister Landing Strip
 McAllister Landing Strip
 The Adwell Corporation Airport

Lakes
 Martin Lake

Landmarks
 Cp Saukenauk
 Lock and Dam No. 20

Demographics
As of the 2020 census there were 514 people, 181 households, and 152 families residing in the township. The racial makeup of the township was 94.55% White, 0.00% African American, 0.19% Native American, 0.00% Asian, 0.00% Pacific Islander, 1.56% from other races, and 3.70% from two or more races. Hispanic or Latino of any race were 2.33% of the population.

There were 181 households, out of which 34.30% had children under the age of 18 living with them, 76.24% were married couples living together, 6.63% had a female householder with no spouse present, and 16.02% were non-families. 14.90% of all households were made up of individuals, and 8.30% had someone living alone who was 65 years of age or older. The average household size was 2.76 and the average family size was 2.93.

The township's age distribution consisted of 25.1% under the age of 18, 8.0% from 18 to 24, 26% from 25 to 44, 32.2% from 45 to 64, and 8.6% who were 65 years of age or older. The median age was 37.3 years. For every 100 females, there were 69.7 males. For every 100 females age 18 and over, there were 96.8 males.

The median income for a household in the township was $76,172, and the median income for a family was $79,643. Males had a median income of $46,016 versus $24,583 for females. The per capita income for the township was $28,039. About 5.9% of families and 6.2% of the population were below the poverty line, including 8.1% of those under age 18 and none of those age 65 or over.

School districts
 Community Unit School District 4

Political districts
 Illinois' 17th congressional district
 State House District 93
 State Senate District 47

References
 
 United States Census Bureau 2007 TIGER/Line Shapefiles
 United States National Atlas

External links
 List of Adams County township trustees
 City-Data.com
 Illinois State Archives

Townships in Adams County, Illinois
1849 establishments in Illinois
Populated places established in 1849
Townships in Illinois